is a single by Alice Nine, and their first digital download. It was released simultaneously with Number Six on October 4, 2006.

A year after its digital release, the track was re-recorded. The new recording is featured in the album Alpha, as well as the music video. The music video for Blue Planet was released on November 1, 2007 on Yahoo.jp. During a live talk with Yahoo, people who logged onto Yahoo could talk to Alice Nine during the broadcast. The video was also released through iTunes Japan.

Track listing

Music video
The music video features Alice Nine members acting natural in a planetarium-like blue room, a young girl adorned with devil horns who watches over the world, and a tightly-dressed woman with pink headgear in the shape of a bunny. Various scenes include singer Shou playing chess with the bunny-eared woman and the band members sitting together thoughtfully.

References

External links
 Official myspace

Alice Nine songs
2006 singles
2006 songs